Ronnie Lane's Slim Chance is the second solo album recorded by Ronnie Lane, one of the founders of Small Faces and Faces, after he left Faces to live on a farm in Wales. In homage to his perceived chances of commercial success, he named his band Slim Chance. Six of the thirteen songs on this album were written by Lane, the rest of Slim Chance, and Kate Lambert, his wife; the remainder were cover versions.

Track listing
"Little Piece of Nothing" (Traditional) – 2:23
"Stone" (Ronnie Lane) – 4:06
"Bottle of Brandy" (Joe Isaacs) – 2:46
"Street Gang" (Lane, Ruan O'Lochlainn, Steve Simpson) – 4:04
"Anniversary" (Lane) – 2:57
"I'm Gonna Sit Right Down (and Write Myself a Letter)" (music: Fred Ahlert; lyrics: Joe Young) – 2:53
"I'm Just a Country Boy" (Fred Brooks, Marshall Barer) – 2:42
"Ain't No Lady" (Lane, Ruan O'Lochlainn, Kate Lambert) – 4:22
"Blue Monday" (Fats Domino, Dave Bartholomew) – 4:07
"Give Me a Penny" (Lane) – 2:57
"You Never Can Tell" (Chuck Berry) – 4:31
"Tin and Tambourine" (Lane, Kate Lambert) – 4:09
"Single Saddle" (Arthur Altman, Hal David) – 3:02

Personnel
Ronnie Lane – vocals, electric and acoustic guitars
Slim Chance
Steve Simpson – electric and acoustic guitars, mandolin, violin, harmonica
Ruan O'Lochlainn – piano, organ, soprano, alto and tenor saxophones
Charlie Hart – piano, organ, accordion, violin
Brian Belshaw – bass
Glen LeFleur – drums, percussion (tracks 1-4, 6-9, 11, 13)
Jim Frank – drums (tracks 5, 10, 12)

Production
Producer: Ronnie Lane
Recording Engineer: John Burns, Ron Fawcus
Artistic Design: Ruan O'Lochlainn
Photography: Ruan O'Lochlainn
Liner Notes: Sid Griffin

References 

1975 albums
Island Records albums
Ronnie Lane albums